This is a non-exhaustive list of Hong Kong women's international footballers – association football players who have appeared at least once for the senior Hong Kong women's national football team.

Players

See also
Hong Kong women's national football team

References

 
Hong Kong
International footballers
Association football player non-biographical articles